5-O-Methylmyricetin is an O-methylated flavonol, a type of flavonoid. It is the 5-O-methyl derivative of myricetin.  It occurs naturally and can also be synthesized.

References 

O-methylated flavonols
Pyrogallols